The viola sonata is a sonata for viola, sometimes with other instruments, usually piano.  The earliest viola sonatas are difficult to date for a number of reasons:
in the Baroque era, there were many works written for the viola da gamba, including sonatas (the most famous being Johann Sebastian Bach's three, now most often played on the cello)
in the Classical era and early Romantic, there were few works written with viola specifically in mind as solo instrument, and many of these, like those of the Stamitz family, may have been written for the viola d'amore, like most of their viola works—though it is now customary to play them on the viola; it was more typical to publish a work or set, like George Onslow's opus 16 cello sonatas, or Johannes Brahms's opus 120 clarinet sonatas in the late 19th century, that specified the viola as an alternate.  Two early exceptions were the viola sonata of Felix Mendelssohn (1824, posthumously published in 1966) and the opus 1 sonata of the composer Ernst Naumann (1832–1910), published in 1854.
 The viola returned to a solo role in the 20th century. Max Reger wrote three sonatas for either clarinet or viola at the beginning of the century. Paul Hindemith, himself a viola virtuoso, composed works several sonatas for viola solo, and others for viola and piano such as the Sonata for Viola and Piano, Op. 11 No. 4 in 1919. Rebecca Clarke composed the Sonata for viola and piano the same year. Bax's Viola Sonata, written (like Walton's concerto) for the great English viola player Lionel Tertis in 1923, is one of his most-played and oft-recorded chamber works. Mieczysław Weinberg wrote four viola sonatas between 1971 and 1983. The Sonata for Viola and Piano, Op. 147, is the last composition by Dmitri Shostakovich, completed in July 1975 and dedicated to Fyodor Druzhinin. György Ligeti wrote his Sonata for Solo Viola between 1991 and 1994.
 In the 21st century, Graham Waterhouse wrote a viola sonata entitled Sonata ebraica , completed in 2013.

Work list

Malcolm Arnold
Sonata for viola and piano, Op. 17 (1947)
Granville Bantock
Sonata in F for viola and piano "Colleen" (1919)
Jan Zdeněk Bartoš
Sonatina for viola and piano, Op. 46
Marion Bauer
Viola Sonata, Op. 22 (1932)
Arnold Bax
Sonata for viola and piano in G (1921–1922)
Fantasy Sonata for viola and harp (1927)
Jack Beeson
Sonata for Viola and Piano (1953)
Arthur Benjamin
Sonata in E minor (1942)
Lennox Berkeley
Sonata in D minor for viola and piano, Op. 22 (1945); see Description from publisher
Valentin Bibik
Sonata for solo viola No. 1, Op. 31 (1977)
Sonata for solo viola No. 2, Op. 136 (1999)
Sonata for viola and piano No. 1, Op. 72 (1988)
Sonata for viola and piano No. 2, Op. 137 (2000)
Easley Blackwood Jr.
Sonata No. 1, Op. 1 (1953) 
Sonata No. 2, Op. 43 (2001) 
Arthur Bliss
Sonata for viola and piano (1933) 
Luigi Boccherini
Viola Sonata in C minor, G.18 for viola (or cello) and continuo
York Bowen
Sonata No. 1 in C minor, Op. 18 (by 1911?) 
Sonata No. 2 in F major, Op. 22 (1911) 
Johannes Brahms
Sonata in F minor for viola and piano, Op. 120 No. 1 (1894) and Sonata in E major for viola and piano, Op. 120 No. 2 (1894), composer's adaptation of the two Clarinet Sonatas
James Francis Brown
Viola Sonata (1995)
Arthur Butterworth
Sonata for viola and piano (1986, though sketched 1949)
Mario Castelnuovo-Tedesco
Sonata for viola and harp, Op. 144; The cello and harp sonata is if not a later work, published later.
Paul Chihara
Sonata for viola and piano (1996)
Rebecca Clarke
Sonata for viola and piano (1919)
Carl Ditters von Dittersdorf
Sonatas for viola and piano
Felix Draeseke
Sonata in C minor (1892)
Sonata in F (1901–2); both composed for Hermann Ritter's viola alta
Lorenzo Ferrero
Sonata for viola and piano (2000)
Jacobo Ficher
Sonata for viola and piano, Op. 80 (1953)
Ross Lee Finney
Sonata for viola and piano
Lillian Fuchs
Sonata pastorale, for solo viola
Robert Fuchs
Sonata for viola and piano in D minor, Op. 86
Harald Genzmer
Sonata for Viola solo (1957)
Sonata for Viola and Piano
Sonatine for Viola and Piano
Roberto Gerhard
Sonata for viola and piano (1946)—later reworked as his cello sonata
Mikhail Glinka
Sonata in D minor for viola and piano (incomplete) (1835)
Hilding Hallnäs
Sonata for viola and piano, Op. 19 (1943)
Hans Werner Henze
Viola Sonata (1979)
Kurt Hessenberg
Sonata for viola and piano, Op. 94
Jennifer Higdon
Sonata for Viola and Piano (1990)
Paul Hindemith
Sonata for Solo Viola, Op. 11 No. 5 (1919)
Sonata for Solo Viola, Op. 25 No. 1 (1922)
Sonata for Solo Viola, Op. 31 No. 4 (1923)
Sonata for Solo Viola (1937)
Sonata for Viola and Piano, Op. 11 No. 4 (1919)
Sonata for Viola and Piano, Op. 25 No. 4 (1922)
Sonata for Viola and Piano (1939)
Vagn Holmboe
Sonata for solo viola
Arthur Honegger
Viola Sonata (1920)
Alan Hovhaness
Campuan Sonata for viola and piano, Op. 371 (1982)
Sonata for Solo Viola, Op. 423
Bertold Hummel
Sonatina No.1, Op. 35b (1969) 
Sonatina No.2, Op. 52b (1973) 
Johann Nepomuk Hummel
Sonata in E-flat for viola and piano, Op. 5 No. 3
Miriam Hyde
Sonata in B minor for viola and piano (1937)
Gordon Jacob
Sonata No. 1 (1949)
Sonata No. 2 (1978)
David Johnstone
Sonatango, Sonata with tango influences for viola solo publ. 2007
Paul Juon
Sonata in D, Op. 15 (1901)
Sonata in F minor, Op. 82 (1923); version of clarinet sonata
Aram Khachaturian
Sonata for viola solo
Friedrich Kiel
Sonata, Op. 67 in G minor
Luigi von Kunits
Sonata for viola and piano (1917)
Ernst Krenek
Sonata for viola solo
Libby Larsen
Sonata for Viola and Piano (2001)
Victor Legley
Sonata for viola and piano, Op. 13 (1943)
Lowell Liebermann
Sonata for Viola and Piano, Op.13 (1984)
György Ligeti
Sonata for Solo Viola (1991–94)
Bohuslav Martinů
Sonata for Viola and Piano (1955)
Felix Mendelssohn
Sonata for viola and piano in C minor (1824)
Darius Milhaud
Sonata No. 1 for Viola and Piano, Op. 240 (1941)
Sonata No. 2 for Viola and Piano, Op. 244 (1944)
José Pablo Moncayo
Sonata for Viola and Piano (1934)
Paul Müller-Zürich
Sonata for Viola Solo (1979)
Jacques Murgier
Sonata for Viola Solo 
Ernst Naumann
Sonata in G minor for Viola and Piano, Op. 1 (1854)
Ludvig Norman
Sonata in G Minor for Viola and Piano, Op. 32 (1869)
George Onslow
three sonatas Op. 16 (played on cello or viola)
George Perle
Sonata for Viola Solo, Op. 12
Max Reger
Sonatas in A major and F minor for viola and piano, Op. 49 Nos. 1 and 2 (1900); alternate versions of clarinet sonatas
Sonata in B major for viola and piano, Op. 107 (1908-9); also for clarinet and piano
George Rochberg
Sonata for viola and piano (1979)
Alessandro Rolla
sonatas for viola with continuo
Johannes Röntgen
Sonata for Viola and Piano
Julius Röntgen
Sonata in C minor for viola and piano (1924)
Sonata in A major for viola and piano (1925)
Sonata in A minor for viola and piano (1925)
Nino Rota
Viola Sonata in G (1934–35, revised 1970)
Viola Sonata in C major (1945)
Anton Rubinstein
Sonata in F minor for viola and piano, Op. 49 (1855)
Philipp Scharwenka
Sonate fantasia in G minor for viola and piano, Op. 106 (1899)
Franz Schubert
Arpeggione Sonata in A minor for viola and piano, D. 821; original work for arpeggione and piano
Peter Sculthorpe
Sonata for viola and percussion
José Serebrier
Sonata for Viola Solo (1955)
Alexander Shchetynsky
Sonata for solo viola (1987)
Vissarion Shebalin
Sonata for Viola and Piano
Dmitri Shostakovich
Sonata for viola and piano, Op. 147 (1975)
David Stanley Smith
Viola Sonata, Op. 72 (1934) (David Stanley Smith Papers at the Irving S. Gilmore Music Library, Yale University)
Carl Stamitz
A sonata originally for viola d'amore
 Constantinos Stylianou
 Sonata for Viola and Piano No. 1 in F minor (2019)
 Sonata for Viola and Piano No. 2 in E flat major (2020)
Eduard Tubin
Viola Sonata (1965)
Johann Baptist Vanhal
Viola Sonata in E
Four Sonatas for viola and piano, Op. 5 (in C major, D, F and C)
Octavio Vazquez
Sonata for Viola and Piano No. 1 (1992)
Sonata for Viola and Piano No. 2 (2002)
Henri Vieuxtemps
Sonata in B major for viola and piano, Op. 36 (1862)
Sonate inachevée (Allegro et scherzo) for viola and piano, Op. 60 (Op. 14 posthumous) (1884)
Andrei Volkonsky
Sonata for Viola and Piano, Op. 8 (1955–56)
Graham Waterhouse
Sonata ebraica (2013)
Mieczysław Weinberg
Sonata for solo viola No. 1, Op. 107 (1971)
Sonata for solo viola No. 2, Op. 123 (1978)
Sonata for solo viola No. 3, Op. 135 (1982)
Sonata for solo viola No. 4, Op. 136 (1983)
George Balch Wilson
Sonata for Viola and Piano (1952)
Richard Edward Wilson
Sonata for viola and piano (1989)

See also 
Viola repertoire
 Viola concerto

References

External links
 The history of Draeseke's Viola Alta Sonatas
 A Mendelssohn Chamber Worklist with Dates
 Schott's page for Nino Rota
 A Viola Sonata Repertoire Page
 Viola fan club with list of recordings and works